Saha (also Romanized as Sahā and Sohā; also known as Saḩeh and Sakha) is a village in Golabar Rural District, in the Central District of Ijrud County, Zanjan Province, Iran. At the 2006 census, its population was 601, in 159 families.

References 

Populated places in Ijrud County